Mathis Magic is an album by American pop singer Johnny Mathis that was released on September 17, 1979, by Columbia Records and contained an equal balance of new material and songs associated with other artists.

Although this album did not make any appearances on Billboard magazine's Top LPs & Tapes chart, it did reach number 59 during a four-week run on the UK album chart. On December 31 of that year the British Phonographic Industry awarded the album with Silver certification for sales of 60,000 units in the UK.

On January 27, 2015, Funkytowngrooves gave Mathis Magic its first pressing on compact disc as one of two albums on one CD, the other album being Mathis's Columbia release from March 1978, You Light Up My Life.

Reception
People magazine's review praises the album's disco arrangements of "Night and Day", "That Old Black Magic", and "To the Ends of the Earth": "While other singers have embarrassed themselves redoing such hallowed material, Mathis makes it work." The reviewer concludes, "Twenty-two years after his first hit, 'Wonderful, Wonderful', Mathis' voice and phrasing are as ingratiating as ever."

Track listing

Side one
 "No One but the One You Love" (Cheryl Christiansen, Arnold Goland, Jack Gold) – 3:14
 "Night and Day" from Gay Divorce  (Cole Porter) – 5:03
 "Love" (Gerard Kenny, Drey Shepperd) – 3:48
 "My Body Keeps Changing My Mind" (Leslie Pearl) – 3:42
 "New York State of Mind" (Billy Joel) – 5:18

Side two
 "She Believes in Me" (Steve Gibb) – 4:22
 "That Old Black Magic" (Harold Arlen, Johnny Mercer) – 5:43
 "You Saved My Life" performed with Stephanie Lawrence  (Chris Arnold, Geoff Morrow) – 2:50
 "To the Ends of the Earth" (Joe Sherman, Noel Sherman) – 2:53
 "Heart, Soul, Body and Mind" (Ben Peters) – 4:10

Recording dates
From the liner notes for The Voice of Romance: The Columbia Original Album Collection:
June 5, 1979 – "Night and Day", "That Old Black Magic"
July 9, 1979 – "No One but the One You Love", "She Believes in Me", "You Saved My Life"
July 23, 1979 – "Heart, Soul, Body and Mind", "Love", "My Body Keeps Changing My Mind", "To the Ends of the Earth"
September 5, 1979 – "New York State of Mind"

Song information
Leo Reisman & His Orchestra's recording of "Night and Day" with Fred Astaire on vocal spent 10 weeks at number one in Billboard magazine in 1933. Billy Joel's "New York State of Mind" first appeared on his 1976 album Turnstiles. "She Believes in Me" by Kenny Rogers received Gold certification from the Recording Industry Association of America after reaching number five on the Billboard Hot 100 and spending two weeks at number one on the magazine's Adult Contemporary and Country charts. Glenn Miller & His Orchestra's version of "That Old Black Magic", which featured Skip Nelson and The Modernaires on vocal, enjoyed a week at number one in 1943, and Nat King Cole made it to number 25 pop with "To the Ends of the Earth" in 1956.

Personnel
From the liner notes for the original album:

Johnny Mathis – vocals
Stephanie Lawrence – vocals ("You Saved My Life"), vocal harmony ("No One but the One You Love")
Jack Gold – producer 
Gene Page – arranger, conductor 
Dick Bogert – engineer
Jo-Anne Steinberg – production coordinator
David Vance – photographer
Michael Boddicker – synthesizer ("Night and Day", "To the Ends of the Earth")
Eddie Bongo – congas ("Night and Day", "That Old Black Magic", "To the Ends of the Earth")
Oscar Brashear – flugelhorn ("New York State of Mind")
Terry Harrington – tenor saxophone ("That Old Black Magic")
Paul Smith – piano ("New York State of Mind")

References

Bibliography

 

1979 albums
Johnny Mathis albums
Albums arranged by Gene Page
Columbia Records albums
Albums recorded at A&M Studios